Abuk is the first woman in the myths of the Dinka people of South Sudan and the Nuer of South Sudan and Ethiopia, who call her Buk  or Acol.  She is the only well-known female deity of the Dinka. She is also the patron goddess of women as well as gardens. Her emblem or symbols are, a small snake, the moon and sheep.  She is the mother of the god of rain and fertility (Denka).  The story from her birth to marriage and child-birth is:

References

External links
Dinka mythology

Dinka mythology
Nuer mythology
African goddesses
Agricultural goddesses
Lunar goddesses